Veľká Lomnica (1808 Welká Lomnica, 1900 Kakaslomnic, 1920 Lomnica, German: Groß Lomnitz) is a large village and municipality in Kežmarok District in the Prešov Region of north Slovakia.

Geography 
The municipality lies at an altitude of 639 metres and covers an area of 19.117 km2 . It has a population of about 4,890 people.

Etymology 
Lomnica is thought to stem from Slav word Lom - (rock) quarry, the name Veľká (great) has been added in later records to differentiate it from two other settlements with the same name.

History 
Archeological finds of fortified settlement of Baden culture in the locality  Burchbrich are dated to the end of stone and beginning of Bronze Age, more than 4000 years ago. 70 small animal sculptures were found as well as many tools.  In the first century BC, the Celts settle here and during Great Moravia period the Slavs arrive.  The village was first mentioned in 1257.  The original Slav population was outnumbered by German settlers in the Middle Ages. In the upheavals of 1945 the Germans were expelled and now the population is formed by Slovak settlers mainly from Pohorela and region of Gorals and also by Roma ethnic group.  The well preserved romano-gothic church of  Catherine of Alexandria was built in the 13th century and rebuilt in the 15th century. It has unique gothic wall frescoes discovered in the 1950s.  The fresco "King Ladislaus fighting the Cumans" is considered one of the most valuable in Slovakia.

Golf course 
In 2005 had been opened a nine holes golf course and a year later additional nine holes course circuit, so in 2012 has Veľká Lomnica altogether 18 holes course. Before opening is another nine holes circuit.  The village is a place of annual golf tournament Charity Golf Cup.

Famous people 

 Ivan Gašparovič, freeman of Veľká Lomnica
 Adolf Burger (1917-2016), a Jewish Holocaust survivor and writer, whose memoirs were made into an Oscar-winning movie
 Georg Buchholtz, geographer
 Ján Hrebík, Czechoslovak Army, resistance movement during World War II
 Samuel Augustini ab Hortis, natural scientist 
 Gregor Berzeviczy, economist
 Andor Nitsch (1883–1976), member of the Czechoslovakian Parliament (1925–1938) for the Zipser German party

References

External links 
 http://www.velkalomnica.sk Official homepage
 http://www.golftatry.sk/ Golf course Veľká Lomnica

Villages and municipalities in Kežmarok District